Karoonda may also refer to:

Karoonda, South Australia, a town and locality
Karoonda Highway, a road in South Australia
Karoonda Magpies, an Australian rules football club in South Australia
Karoonda meteorite, a meteorite found in South Australia
District Council of Karoonda, a former local government area in South Australia; now part of the District Council of Karoonda East Murray